Alan Nathan is a centrist US radio talk show host and columnist. He starts his shows with the mantra: We want the Republicans out of our bedrooms, the Democrats out of our wallets, and both out of our First and Second Amendment rights! and describes himself as The Militant Moderate. He has sometimes been labeled as libertarian.

Nathan's style is noted for its speed, skilled debate, and rigorous logic.

Nathan began his career in radio as a DJ at 1480 WPWC Radio in Dumfries, VA, and it was there where he aired his first talk show, Profile and Comment With Alan Nathan. Soon afterward, he adapted this program to public-access television and caught the attention of legendary columnist and then anchor personality, Jack Anderson. Based on Mr. Anderson's experience as a guest on Profile and Comment, Nathan was hired as a correspondent on the Financial News Network's Insiders With Jack Anderson.

In 1998, Nathan started "Spanking the Left and Right," a local show on WZHF 1390 AM in the Washington, D.C. market.  He was soon picked up by the Radio America Network and became the syndicated weekend host of "Battling The Left And Right."  In 2000, that show also became a daily program and was renamed "Battle Line with Alan Nathan."

Wanting to commit more time to his columns, Nathan decided that effective September 4, 2006, he would cease "Battle Line's" daily syndication but would continue its long running syndicated weekend edition.

In 2010, however, he joined forces with Main Street Radio Network as Vice President (overseeing programming and syndication) and seamlessly continued "Battle Line's" weekend show.  Later in 2010, he added the resumption of "Battle Line's" daily edition.  In November 2012, Main Street Radio's distribution was moved to the Salem Radio Network where it continues today.

In August 2013, Alan yielded to popular request and changed the name of his program from "Battle Line with Alan Nathan" to "The Alan Nathan Show." As quoted in All Access, "They've been calling it the 'ALAN NATHAN SHOW' for years, so I learned how to take a hint. Additionally, while there’s plenty of spirited debate (or battling) happening on the program, it's also a guest generated, panel driven event that teases all who take themselves too seriously." The Show is entering its 17th year of syndication and is aired live Monday to Friday (5-7pm) with many stations doing a delay broadcast (between 8-10pm and 2-4am overnight).  Weekend airings are Saturday (6-7pm) and Sunday (3-4am) ET 

Talkers Magazine rated Nathan as one of the Top 100 Talk Hosts in America for 2002, 2003 and 2005.

Columnist
Alan Nahan is also a contributor to several magazines and websites, including The Washington Times, FrontPage Magazine, Insight on the News, WorldNetDaily, and The Examiner.

References

External links
 Official Alan Nathan website
 Official Main Street Radio website
 Main Street Radio player
 Partial Guest List, Peer Accolades
  A library of Alan Nathan's Writings 

Living people
Year of birth missing (living people)
American talk radio hosts